The name British International School is a common name for a number of schools throughout the world. It may refer to
member schools of Council of British International Schools
member schools of Federation of British International Schools in Asia
British International School in Cairo
British International School of Cracow
British International School, Jakarta
British International School of Ljubljana
British International School in Lome, Togo
British International School (Moscow)
British International School of New York
British International School Prague
British International School Shanghai
British International School Vietnam
St. George's British International School
british international school British International School in Ukraine

See also
British school (disambiguation)
:Category:British international schools